The Oklahoma Sooners men's basketball and women's basketball programs are college basketball teams that represents the University of Oklahoma. Both teams play at the Division I level of the National Collegiate Athletics Association (NCAA).

The men's team has had 12 head coaches—excluding a coach who died before ever coaching a game, Lester Lane. Oklahoma started organized basketball with the nickname Sooners in 1908. The men's program has played in more than 2,400 games in a total of 102 seasons. In those seasons, five coaches have led the Sooners to at least one postseason tournament: Bruce Drake, Dave Bliss, Billy Tubbs, Kelvin Sampson and Jeff Capel. Five coaches have won conference championships with the Sooners: Hugh McDermott, Drake, Bliss, Tubbs and Sampson. McDermott and Drake both have had the longest tenure at Oklahoma. Tubbs is the all-time leader in games coached and wins. Sampson is the all-time leader in winning percentage. Statistically, Bob Stevens has been the least successful coach of the Sooner men, with a winning percentage of .368. Drake is the only Oklahoma coach who has been inducted into the Basketball Hall of Fame. The most recent men's coach was Jeff Capel, who was hired in 2006 and served until 2011.

The women's program has had nine head coaches. Oklahoma started an organized women's basketball program in 1974. The women have played in more than 1,000 games in a total of 25 seasons. In those seasons, three coaches have led the Sooners to at least one postseason tournament: Maura McHugh, Burl Plunkett, and Sherri Coale. Coale is the only coach who has won conference championships with the Sooners. Hired in April 1996, Coale is the all-time leader in games coached, wins and winning percentage. Statistically, Amy Dahl has been the worst coach of the Lady Sooners, with a winning percentage of .125.

Key

Coaches
Statistics are correct as of the end of the 2009–10 men's and women's college basketball season.

Men's

Women's

Notes

References
General

Specific

Oklahoma
Oklahoma
Oklahoma Sooners basketball coaches